is a contemporary artist who works in Belgium, China, and Mexico.

From 2000 to 2003, he taught sculpture at UCLA as a visiting instructor.

Work 
His great love and fascination for nature, combined with an open approach to life and art, galvanizes a highly unconventional art. Sone works in various media and is primarily known for his sculpture - including marble and crystal carving and installations - but he also paints, creates performance art, and creates films. Some of Sone’s sculptural works include cities or sceneries carved into large blocks of marble, and oversized snowflakes carved out of single pieces of natural crystal. Sone does not exploit the heritage of one particular culture through his work, but instead draws on his extensive travels as he strives to create a singular poetic vocabulary connected to culture at large.

Exhibitions
Sone's work was the subject of solo exhibitions at Maison Hermès Le Forum, Tokyo from December 2010 to February 2010 and at Tokyo Opera City Art Gallery from January 2011 to March 2011. His 25-foot tall sculpture, titled Baby Banana Tree, was installed as a public artwork at the Boone Sculpture Garden, Pasadena City College in Pasadena, California, in 2009. Other recent solo exhibitions include Parasol unit for contemporary art, London (2007), David Zwirner, New York (1999, 2004, 2006, 2007, 2011, and 2016), Kunsthalle Bern, Switzerland (2006), Aspen Museum of Art, Aspen, Colorado (2006), The Renaissance Society at the University of Chicago, Illinois (2006), Museum of Contemporary Art, Los Angeles (2003), and Toyota Municipal Museum of Art, Toyota City, Japan (2002).

His work has been shown internationally including the Venice Biennale (2003) where he had a two-person exhibit in the Japanese pavilion, and numerous important group exhibitions, including the Museum of Contemporary Art Chicago, Illinois (2005), and the Whitney Biennial (2004).

References

External links
Yutaka Sone Biography at Tommy Simoens
Yutaka Sone on Artnet
"Yutaka Sone’s Hot Tropics and Marble Cityscapes" by Hilarie M. Sheets

1965 births
Living people
Japanese contemporary artists